Cianciulli may refer to:

 Leonarda Cianciulli (18941970), Italian serial killer
 Matthew Cianciulli (19422008), American politician
 Michele Cianciulli (18951965), Italian lawyer, historian, and philosopher
 Michele Angelo Cianciulli (17341819), Sicilian marquis and statesman